This list of weekly newspapers in the United States is a list of weekly newspapers as described at newspaper types and weekly newspapers that are printed and distributed in the United States.

In particular, this list considers a newspaper to be a weekly newspaper if the newspaper is published once, twice, or thrice a week.  A weekly newspaper is usually a smaller publication than a larger, daily newspaper (such as one that covers a metropolitan area). Unlike these metropolitan newspapers, a weekly newspaper will cover a smaller area, such as one or more smaller towns or an entire county.  Most weekly newspapers follow a similar format as daily newspapers (i.e., news, sports, family news, obituaries). However, the primary focus is on news from the publication's coverage area. The publication date of weekly newspapers varies, but usually they come out in the middle of the week (e.g., Wednesday or Thursday).  This list includes semi-weekly newspapers that may be published twice or thrice a week.

The 50 states and Washington, D.C.

Alabama 
The following are weekly or semi-weekly newspapers published in Alabama:
 The Alabama Baptist - Birmingham
 Birmingham Business Journal - Birmingham
 Daleville Sun-Courier - Daleville
 The Dekalb Advertiser - Fort Payne
 Lagniappe - Mobile
 The North Jefferson News - Gardendale
 The Southeast Sun - Enterprise
 The Times-Record - Fayette
 The Western Star - Bessemer
 Chilton County News - Clanton

Alaska 
 Alaska Journal of Commerce - Anchorage
 Alaska Star - Eagle River and Chugiak
 Anchorage Press - Anchorage
 Arctic Sounder - Northwest Arctic Borough and North Slope Borough
 Bristol Bay Times - Bristol Bay
 Capital City Weekly - Juneau
 Chilkat Valley News - Haines
 Cordova Times - Cordova
 The Delta Discovery - Bethel
 Dutch Harbor Fisherman - Aleutians / Pribilofs
 Homer News - Homer
 Homer Tribune - Homer
 Mat-Su Valley Frontiersman - Wasilla / Matanuska-Susitna Valley (tri-weekly)
 The Nome Nugget - Nome
 Petersburg Pilot - Petersburg
 Petroleum News - Anchorage
 Seward Journal - Seward
 Seward Phoenix Log - Seward, Moose Pass
 Tundra Drums - Bethel and Yukon-Kuskokwim Delta
 The Valdez Star - Valdez

Arizona 
 Ahwatukee Foothills News - Ahwatukee, Phoenix
 Ajo Copper News - Ajo
 Apache Junction News - Apache Junction
 Arizona Business Gazette - Phoenix
 Arizona Capitol Times - Phoenix
 Arizona City Independent - Arizona City
 Arizona Range News - Willcox
 Arizona Silver Belt - Globe
 Bisbee Observer - Bisbee
 Casa Grande Dispatch - Casa Grande
 The Catholic Sun - Phoenix
 Chino Valley Review - Chino Valley
 Fountain Hills Times - Fountain Hills
 Inside Tucson Business - Tucson
 Jewish News of Greater Phoenix - Phoenix 
 Kingman Standard - Kingman
 La Voz - Phoenix and Tucson
 Lake Powell Chronicle - Page
 Navajo-Hopi Observer - Flagstaff
 Navajo Times - Window Rock
 Nogales International - Nogales
 The Northwest Explorer - Tucson
 Phoenix Business Journal - Phoenix
 Phoenix New Times - Phoenix
 Sedona Red Rock News - Sedona
 Sonoran News - Cave Creek
 Tucson Weekly - Tucson
 Verde Independent - Cottonwood
 West Valley View - Avondale
 The Winslow Mail - Winslow

Arkansas 
 Sherwood Voice - Sherwood
 Times of Northeast Benton County - Pea Ridge

California 
 The Ark - Tiburon
 Lucerne Valley Leader - Lucerne Valley
 Mountain Messenger - Downieville
 Paradise Post -  Paradise

Colorado 
Intermountain Jewish News - Denver
Ouray County Plaindealer - Ouray County
Pagosa Springs Sun - Pagosa Springs
Rio Blanco Herald Times - Rio Blanco County
Sopris Sun - Carbondale
The Mountain Jackpot - Woodland Park

Connecticut 
 The Lakeville Journal - Lakeville, Canaan/Falls Village

Delaware

District of Columbia 
The Current Newspapers - Washington, D.C. (ceased in 2019)
Washington City Paper - Washington, D.C.

Florida 
 Florida Weekly - Fort Myers
 Hendry Glades Sunday News - LaBelle
 Hometown News - 15 East Coast cities
 Jackson County Times - Marianna, Florida
 Miami Today - Miami, Florida
 Observer Newspaper - Deerfield Beach
 Orlando Weekly - Florida
 Tampa Bay Newspapers - Pinellas County (publisher of Beach Beacon, Belleair Bee, Clearwater Beacon, Dunedin Beacon, Largo Leader, Palm Harbor Beacon, Pinellas Park Beacon and Seminole Beacon)
 Windermere Sun - Windermere, Florida

Georgia 
 Creative Loafing - Atlanta

Hawaii 
Honolulu Weekly - Honolulu

Idaho 
Meridian Press - Meridian
The Life News  - Post Falls
Messenger-Index - Emmett
Arco Advertiser - Arco, Idaho

Illinois 
Chicago Crusader - Chicago
The Chicago Reader - Chicago
Illinois Times - Springfield
Tuscola Review - Tuscola
Arcola Record-Herald - Arcola
Lebanon Advertiser - Lebanon
Galena Gazette - Galena

Indiana 
Gary Crusader - Gary
The Paper of Wabash County - Wabash County
The Pulaski County Journal - Pulaski County
The Mount Vernon Democrat - Posey County

Iowa

Kansas 

 Anderson County Advocate – Garnett
 Anderson County Review – Garnett
 The Anthony Republican – Anthony
 Baldwin City Gazette – Baldwin City
 Basehor Sentinel – Basehor
 The Belle Plaine News – Belle Plaine
 The Belleville Telescope – Belleville
 The Coffeyville Journal – Coffeyville
 The Colby Free Press – Colby
 The Community Voice - Wichita, Kansas
 Concordia Blade-Empire – Concordia
 Conway Springs Star & Argonia Argosy – Conway Springs
 The Courier-Tribune (Kansas) – Seneca
 The Courtland Journal - Courtland
 The Cunningham Courier - Cunningham
 The De Soto Explorer – De Soto
 The Derby Informer – Derby
 Downs News & Times – Downs
 The Eudora News – Eudora
 The Eureka Herald – Eureka
 Farm Talk Newspaper – Parsons
 The Fort Leavenworth Lamp – Fort Leavenworth
 Garden City Telegram – Garden City
 Hays Post – Hays (online only)
 Haysville Sun-Times – Haysville
 The Herington Times - Herington
 Hiawatha World – Hiawatha
 High Plains Journal – Dodge City
 Hillsboro Free Press – Hillsboro
 Hillsboro Star-Journal – Hillsboro
 The Holton Recorder – Holton
 Hometown Girard – Girard
 The Humboldt Union - Humboldt
 The Hype Weekly (alternative weekly newspaper) - Manhattan
 The Iola Register – Iola
 The Jackson County Journal - Holton
 Kansas City Kansan – Kansas City (online only)
 Labette Avenue - Oswego
 Kiowa County Signal – Greensburg
 The Kiowa News – Kiowa
 Larned Tillers & Toiler – Larned
 Marion County Record – Marion
 Marysville Advocate – Marysville
 Montgomery County Chronicle – Caney
 The Mulberry Advance – Mulberry
 The Oxford Register – Oxford
 Peabody Gazette-Bulletin – Peabody
 The Pratt Tribune – Pratt
 Prairie Star – Sedan
 The Rush County News – La Crosse
 The Sentinel-Times – Galena
 St John News – St. John
 The Times-Sentinel – Cheney
 The Topeka Plaindealer - Topeka
 Wamego Smoke Signal - Wamego
 The Wellington Daily News - Wellington (prints once per week but maintains "Daily" in the name)

Kentucky 
The Cadiz Record - Cadiz

Louisiana 

Avoyelles Journal - Avoyelles
Baton Rouge Weekly Press - Baton Rouge
Bunkie Record - Avoyelles
Donaldsonville Chief - Donaldsonville
Gonzales Weekly Citizen - Gonzales
Marksville Weekly News - Avoyelles
Plaquemine Post South - Plaquemine
The St. Bernard Voice - St. Bernard 
Ouachita Citizen - West Monroe

Maine 
 The Advertiser Democrat - Norway, published once a week on Thursdays
 American Journal - Westbrook
 Aroostook Republican - Caribou
 Augusta Capital Weekly - Augusta
 The Bar Harbor Times - Bar Harbor, published once a week on Thursdays
 The Bates Student - Lewiston, published once a week on Tuesdays
The Boothbay Register - Boothbay Harbor, published once a week on Thursdays
 The Bowdoin Orient - Brunswick, published once a week on Fridays
 The Bridgton News - Bridgton, published once a week on Thursdays
 The Calais Advertiser - Calais, published once a week on Thursdays
 The Camden Herald - Camden
 The Castine Patriot - Castine, published once a week on Thursdays
 The Citizen - Westbrook
 The Colby Echo - Waterville, published once a week on Tuesdays
 The Courier Gazette - Rockland
 The Current - Westbrook, published once a week on Thursdays
 The Ellsworth American - Ellsworth
 The Enterprise - Bucksport
 The Houlton Pioneer Times - Houlton, published once a week on Wednesdays
 The Island Ad-Vantages - Stonington, published once a week on Thursdays
 The Island Times - Casco Bay, published monthly
 Lakes Region Suburban Weekly - Westbrook
 The Lincoln County News - Damariscotta, published once a week on Wednesdays
 The Livermore Falls Advertiser - Livermore Falls, published once a week on Wednesdays
 Machias Valley News Observer - Machias
 Magic City Morning Star - Millinocket
 The Maine Campus - Orono, published twice a week on Mondays and Thursdays
 The Maine Edge - Bangor, published once a week on Wednesdays
 Maine Sunday Telegram - Portland
 The Maine Switch - Portland, published once a week on Thursdays
 The Mid-Coast Forecaster - published weekly alongside The Northern Forecaster, The Portland Forecaster and The Southern Forecaster
 Mount Desert Islander - Bar Harbor, published once a week on Thursdays
 The Northern Forecaster - published weekly alongside The Portland Forecaster, The Mid-Coast Forecaster and The Southern Forecaster
 The Penobscot Times - Old Town
 The Portland Forecaster  - published weekly alongside The Northern Forecaster, The Mid-Coast Forecaster and The Southern Forecaster Portland Phoenix - Portland, published once a week on Wednesdays
 The Quoddy Tides - Eastport
 The Reporter - Westbrook
 The Republican Journal - Belfast
 Six Towns Times - Freeport, published weekly on Fridays
 The St. John Valley Times - Madawaska, published once a week on Wednesdays
 The Star-Herald - Presque Isle, published once a week on Wednesdays
 The Southern Forecaster - published weekly alongside The Northern Forecaster, The Mid-Coast Forecaster and The Portland Forecaster Sun Chronicle - Westbrook)
 Twin City Times - Auburn, covering Androscoggin County and the surrounding areas; published every Thursday
 The Weekly Packet - Blue Hill, published once a week on Thursdays
 The Weekly Sentinel - Wells, published once a week on FridaysWiscasset Newspaper - Boothbay Harbor, published once a week on Thursdays
 York County Coast Star - Kennebunk, published once a week on Thursdays
 York Weekly - York, published once a week on Wednesdays

 Maryland 
 The Cecil Guardian - Elkton, MarylandGreenbelt News Review - Greenbelt

 Massachusetts The Boston Phoenix - BostonMartha's Vineyard Times - Martha's VineyardWinthrop Sun Transcript - Winthrop

 Michigan Benton Spirit - Benton HarborBerrien County Record - BuchananTroy-Somerset Gazette - Troy, MichiganHarbor Country News - New BuffaloThe Mears Newz - Mears, MichiganMetro Times - DetroitNew Buffalo Times - New Buffalo

 Minnesota City Pages - Minneapolis

 Mississippi 

 Charleston Sun-Sentinel Clarke County Tribune Clarksdale Press Register Delta Democrat-Times Grenada Star Newton County Appeal Scott County Times Simpson County News Tate Record The Carroll County Conservative The Choctaw Plaindealer The Columbian Progress The Enterprise-Tocsin The Kosciusko Star-Herald The Northside Sun The Pine Belt News The Winona Times The Winston County Journal The Yazoo Herald Webster Progress-Times Missouri 
 Branson Tri-Lakes News - Branson, Taney County, Stone County
 The Marshfield Mail - Marshfield
 South County Times - St. Louis
 Ste. Genevieve Herald - Ste. Genevieve
 Webster-Kirkwood Times - St. Louis

 Montana 

 Nebraska 
 Gering Citizen - Gering

 Nevada 
 Northern Nevada Business Weekly Moapa Valley Progress New Hampshire 
 The Hippo - Manchester
 The Londonderry Times - Londonderry
 Manchester Express - Manchester
 The Nutfield News - Londonderry
 The Tri-Town Times - Londonderry

 New Jersey Bernardsville News - Bernardsville, Bernards Township, Far Hills, Peapack-Gladstone, and BedminsterChatham Courier - Chatham Township, Chatham BoroughEchoes-Sentinel - Long Hill Township, Warren Township, WatchungFlorham Park Eagle - Florham ParkHanover Eagle - Hanover TownshipHunterdon Review - Bethlehem Township, Califon, Clinton Township, Clinton Town, High Bridge, Lebanon Township, Lebanon Borough, Tewksbury Township, and Readington TownshipMadison Eagle - Madison BoroughMicromedia Publications - Monmouth/Ocean CountyMorris NewsBee - Morris Plains, Morris Township, MorristownMount Olive Chronicle - Mount Olive TownshipObserver-Tribune - Harding Township, Mendham Borough, Mendham Township, Chester Borough, Chester Township, Washington TownshipRandolph Reporter - Randolph Township and Mine Hill TownshipRoxbury Register - Roxbury Township, Mount ArlingtonThe Citizen - Rockaway Township, Rockaway Borough, Boonton, Boonton Township, Dover, Denville Township, Mountain Lakes, MontvilleThe Community Gazette - Princeton
 The Monmouth Journal - Red BankThe Progress - Caldwell, North Caldwell, West Caldwell, Fairfield, Roseland, Essex Fells
 The Retrospect - Collingswood
 The Westfield Leader - Westfield
 Union County HAWK - Union County
 Union County Local Source - Union Township

 New Mexico New Mexico Tribune - AlbuquerqueSanta Fe Reporter - Santa FeWeekly Alibi - AlbuquerqueLas Cruces Bulletin - Las CrucesUnion County Leader - Clayton

 New York 
Anton Media Group - Nassau CountyClinton County Free Trader - PlattsburghEast Hampton Star - East HamptonThe Hancock Herald - HancockLong Island Advance - Bayport, Bellport, Blue Point, Patchogue, Mastic, Moriches, and YaphankLong Island Herald - Nassau CountyThe Salamanca Press - Salamanca (city), New YorkThe Times of Wayne County - Wayne County
The River Reporter - Sullivan County

 North Carolina Andrews Journal - AndrewsCherokee Scout - MurphyCherokee Sentinel - MurphyClay County Progress - HayesvilleCreative Loafing - CharlotteGraham Sentinel - RobbinsvilleSmoky Mountain Sentinel - Hayesville

 North Dakota 
 The Journal - Crosby
 Tioga Tribune - Tioga

 Ohio Bethel Journal - Bethel, Chilo, Felicity, Franklin Township, Moscow, Neville, Tate Township, Washington TownshipCommunity Journal Clermont - Amelia, Batavia, Batavia Township, New Richmond Ohio Township, Pierce Township, Union Township, Williamsburg, Williamsburg TownshipCommunity Journal North Clermont - Clermont CountyCommunity Press Mason-Deerfield - Deerfield Township, Kings Mills, Landen, MasonDelhi Press - Delhi Township, Sayler ParkEastern Hills Journal - Columbia Township, Columbia Tusculum, Fairfax, Hyde Park, Madisonville, Mariemont, Mount Lookout, Oakley, Terrace ParkForest Hills Journal - Anderson Township, California, Mount Washington, NewtownHilltop Press - College Hills, Finneytown, Forest Park, Greenhills, Mount Airy, Mount Healthy, North College Hill, Seven Hills, Springfield TownshipIndian Hill Journal - Indian HillLoveland Herold - LovelandMilford-Miami Adverstiser - Milford/Miami TownshipNortheast Suburban Life Northwest Press - Colerain Township and parts of Green Township Price Hill Press - Price HillThe News-Tribune - HicksvilleThe Spanish Journal - CincinnatiSuburban LifeTri-County Press Western Hills Press - Addyston, Bridgetown, Cheviot, Covedale, Dent, Green Township, Mack, Miami Township, North Bend, Westwood

 Oklahoma 
   The Lone Grove Ledger - Lone Grove

 Oregon Beaverton Valley Times - BeavertonCentral Oregonian - PrinevilleEugene Weekly - EugeneHeadlight-Herald - TillamookNews Guard - Lincoln CityNews-Times - Forest GroveThe Outlook - GreshamThe Portland Mercury - PortlandPortland Tribune - PortlandSalem Weekly - SalemThe Sandy Post - Sandy
The Source Weekly - Bend
Willamette Week - Portland
Wilsonville Spokesman - Wilsonville
Woodburn Independent - Woodburn

Pennsylvania 
 Bradford Journal  - Bradford

Rhode Island 
 The Valley Breeze

South Carolina 
The Chapin Times - Chapin
The Charleston City Paper - Charleston
The Newberry Observer - Newberry

South Dakota 
 True Dakotan - Wessington Springs

Tennessee 
El Crucero Newspaper (Spanish) - Nashville, Murfreesboro, Gallatin, Clarksville (weekly)
Dresden Enterprise - Dresden
Eagleville Times - Eagleville (twice-monthly)
Sewanee Mountain Messenger - Sewanee (weekly)
Weakley County Press - Martin (twice-weekly)

Texas 
 Frankston Citizen - Frankston
 Jewish Herald-Voice - Houston
 Raymondville Chronicle /  Willacy County News  - Raymondville
 Cherokeean Herald - Rusk
 The Schulenburg Sticker - Schulenburg
 The Houston Press - Houston www.houstonpress.com/

Utah 
Magna Times - Magna
Salt Lake City Weekly - Salt Lake City

Vermont 
Addison County Independent - Middlebury
Bradford Journal-Opinion - Bradford
Charlotte Citizen - Charlotte
Deerfield Valley News - Wilmington
The Essex Reporter - Essex
Franklin County Courier - Enosburg Falls
Herald of Randolph - Randolph
Lake Champlain Islander - Grand Isle County
Milton Independent - Milton
Morrisville News and Citizen - Morrisville
Seven Days - Burlington
Shelburne News - Shelburne
Valley Reporter - Waitsfield
Vermont Eagle - Middlebury
Vermont Standard - Woodstock

Virginia 
 Alexandria Gazette Packet - Alexandria
 The Amelia Bulletin Monitor - Amelia Court House
 Las Américas Newspaper - Falls Church (Spanish language newspaper)
 Amherst New Era-Progress - Amherst
 Bedford Bulletin - Bedford
 Bland County Messenger - Bland County
 The CentreView - Centreville
 Clinch Valley News - Tazewell
 El Comercio  - Woodbridge 
 Courier-Record - Blackstone
 El Eco de Virginia - Norfolk (Spanish language newspaper)
 Fairfax Times - Fairfax County
 The Falls Church News Press - Falls Church
 Farmville Herald - Farmville (published twice weekly)
 Flagship News - Norfolk (military newspaper serving the entire Hampton Roads area)
 The Floyd Press - Floyd
 The Galax Gazette - Galax
 Gloucester-Mathews Gazette-Journal - Gloucester
 Greene County Record - Stanardsville
 Henrico Citizen - Henrico County, Virginia (published two times a week)
 El Imparcial - Manassas (Spanish language newspaper)
 Inside Business - Norfolk
 The King George Journal - King George
 Loudoun Times-Mirror - Ashland
 Madison Eagle - Madison
 Mount Vernon Voice - Alexandria
 The New Journal and Guide - Norfolk
 Orange County Review - Orange
 The Page News and Courier - Page County
 The Politico - Arlington County
 Powhatan Today - Powhatan
 Purcellville Gazette - Loudoun County, Virginia
 Rappahannock News - Washington
 The Richlands News-Press - Richlands
 Richmond Free Press - Richmond
 Roanoke Star-Sentinel - Roanoke
 Roanoke Tribune - Roanoke
 The Smithfield Times - Smithfield
 Smyth County News & Messenger - Marion (published two times a week)
 The Southside Messenger - Keysville
 Southside Sentinel - Urbanna
 Style Weekly - Richmond
 Tidewater News - Franklin (published three times a week)
 Tidewater Review - West Point
 El Tiempo Latino - Arlington (Spanish language newspaper)
 The Virginia Gazette - Williamsburg (published two times a week)
 Virginia Lawyers Weekly - Richmond
 La Voz Hispana de Virginia Magazine - Richmond
 Washington County News - Abingdon 
 Westmoreland News  - Westmoreland County
 Wytheville Enterprise - Wythe County (published two times a week)
 Yorktown Crier-Poquoson Post - Yorktown

Washington 
Cascadia Weekly - Bellingham
La Conner Weekly News - Skagit County
The Facts (Seattle) - Seattle
Okanogan Valley Gazette-Tribune - Oroville-Tonasket
Omak-Okanogan County Chronicle - Omak
The Pacific Northwest Inlander - Spokane
The Reflector - Battle Ground
Seattle Weekly - Seattle
The Stranger - Seattle
The Wahkiakum County Eagle - Cathlamet, Washington

West Virginia 
The Moorefield Examiner - Moorefield
The Putnam Herald - Huntington
Pennsboro News - Pennsboro and Ritchie County

Wisconsin 
 Chetek Alert - Chetek
 Isthmus - Madison
 The Onion - Madison
 The Peshtigo Times - Peshtigo
 Shepherd Express - Milwaukee

Wyoming 
Jackson Hole News&Guide - Jackson
Planet Jackson Hole - Jackson

See also
Comprehensive
Lists of newspapers
List of newspapers in the United States

Frequency
List of free daily newspapers in the United States

Circulation
List of international newspapers originating in the United States
List of national newspapers in the United States
List of newspapers in the United States by circulation
List of newspapers serving cities over 100,000 in the United States

Foreign language
 List of French-language newspapers published in the United States
 List of Spanish-language newspapers published in the United States

Specialty
List of African-American newspapers in the United States
List of alternative weekly newspapers in the United States
List of business newspapers in the United States
List of family-owned newspapers in the United States
List of Jewish newspapers in the United States
List of LGBT periodicals in the United States
List of student newspapers in the United States
List of supermarket tabloids in the United States
List of underground press in the United States

Other
List of defunct newspapers of the United States

References

External links
newspaperlinks.com
United States of America Press
US Newspaper List
Yahoo U.S. newspaper list
Newspapers - USA and worldwide

Lists of newspapers published in the United States